Bernard Roy Frieden (born September 10, 1936) is an American mathematical physicist.

Frieden obtained a Ph.D. in Optics from The Institute of Optics at the University of Rochester. His doctoral thesis advisor was Robert E. Hopkins. Frieden is now an Emeritus Professor of Optical Sciences at the University of Arizona.

Work on Fisher information in Physics
Frieden is best known for his extensive work on Fisher information as a grounding principle for deriving and elaborating physical theory. (Examples are the Schrödinger wave equation of quantum mechanics, and the Maxwell–Boltzmann distribution of statistical mechanics.) Such theories take the form of differential equations or probability distribution functions.

Central to Frieden's derivations is the mathematical variational principle of extreme physical information (EPI). This principle builds on the well-known idea that the observation of a "source" phenomenon is never completely accurate. That is, information is inevitably lost in transit from source to observation. Furthermore, the random errors that creep in are presumed to define the distribution function of the source phenomenon. As Frieden puts it, "the physics lies in the fluctuations." Finally, the information loss may be shown to be an extreme value. Thus if the observed level of Fisher information in the data has value I, and the level of Fisher information that existed at the source has value J, the EPI principle states that I − J = extremum. In most situations, the extremum is a minimum, meaning that there is a tendency for any observation to faithfully match up with its source.

Applications
Frieden has used Fisher information and the EPI principle to derive most existing fundamental laws of physics, and some new and existing laws of biology, cancer growth, chemistry, and economics. Frieden argues that Fisher information, especially its loss I − J during observation, and EPI make up a general method for deriving scientific laws.

Criticism
There is a view that puts into doubt the physical and mathematical correctness of Frieden's ideas, this coming from Raymond F. Streater's Lost Causes in Theoretical Physics: Physics from Fisher Information, and Cosma Shalizi's review of Physics from Fisher Information. However, both these perspectives have been undermined .

See also
 Fisher information
 Variational principle

Bibliography

Frieden, B.R. and Gatenby, R.A., eds. (2006) Exploratory Data Analysis Using Fisher Information. Springer-Verlag, in press.

External links
Roy Frieden Professor Emeritus of Optical Sciences.
Frieden, B. Roy, "Fisher Information, a New Paradigm for Science: Introduction, Uncertainty principles, Wave equations, Ideas of Escher, Kant, Plato and Wheeler." This essay is continually revised.
Any old maths: Roy Frieden's project to unify physics based on Fisher information from New Scientist issue 2174, 20 February 1999, p. 53

1936 births
Living people
20th-century American mathematicians
21st-century American mathematicians
21st-century American physicists
University of Rochester alumni
University of Arizona faculty